WVZN (1580 AM, "Vision 1580") is a non-commercial educational AM radio station licensed to serve Columbia, Pennsylvania. The station is owned by Radio Vision Cristiana Management and while currently silent, the station has aired a Spanish Christian radio format.

Translator
The following translator is licensed to simulcast the programming of WVZN:

External links
 
 
 

VZN
Radio stations established in 1946
VZN
1946 establishments in Pennsylvania